John J. Howard (1869 – January 24, 1941) was an American politician from New York.

Life
He was born in 1869 in Brooklyn, Kings County, New York.

Howard was a member of the New York State Assembly (Kings Co., 7th D.) in 1922, 1923, 1924, 1925, 1926, 1927, 1928, 1929 and 1930.

He was a member of the New York State Senate (5th D.) from 1931 until his death in 1941, sitting in the 154th, 155th, 156th, 157th, 158th, 159th, 160th, 161st, 162nd and 163rd New York State Legislatures.

He died on January 24, 1941, at his home at 453 Fifty-fifth Street in Brooklyn, of a heart attack.

Sources

1869 births
1941 deaths
Democratic Party New York (state) state senators
Politicians from Brooklyn
Democratic Party members of the New York State Assembly